Jardinière is a French word, from the feminine form of "gardener".  In English it means a decorative flower box or "planter", a receptacle (usually a ceramic pot or urn) or a stand upon which, or into which, plants (often in pots) may be placed, usually indoors. The French themselves mostly refer to tabletop "planter" versions of such receptacles as cachepots ("hide-pots").  The French tend to use jardinière for larger outdoor containers for plants, and for raised beds in gardens in some sort of isolated frame, such as a stone wall, especially growing vegetables and herbs.

In the sense in English jardinières, often without the accent, are most often made in pottery, but may be in metal, glass, plastic or wood.  They may be supplied with liners.

In cookery, another French meaning, a dish that is cooked or served with a mixture of spring vegetables, such as peas, carrots, and green beans, is also used.

The horticulturist Gertrude Jekyll wrote:

In French, it is also a common name for the golden ground beetle, which attacks pests in kitchen gardens.

Gallery

See also

 List of English words of French origin
 Container garden
 Potting soil

References

External links

 Collection of jardinières at the Victoria & Albert Museum.

Containers
Garden ornaments
Garden vases
Gardening aids
Pottery shapes